Marsupium is the Latin word for a (brood) pouch in several animal groups:

 Pouch (marsupial), in marsupials
 Brood pouch (Peracarida), in peracarid crustaceans
 Brood pouch (Syngnathidae), in syngnathids such as sea horses
 Brood pouch (gastropod), a part of the reproductive system of gastropods, a structure in ovoviviparous gastropods, where embryos develop

See also
 Brood (disambiguation)
 Pouch (disambiguation)